Charlie Stewart was a Scottish football player during the 1950s and 1960s.  He started his career with junior side Johnstone Burgh before signing 'senior' with Dumbarton.  Here he played with distinction, being a constant in the attack for three seasons. He moved twice to play with Morton but on each occasion returned to Dumbarton – and finally saw out his career with Stenhousemuir.

References 

Scottish footballers
Dumbarton F.C. players
Greenock Morton F.C. players
Stenhousemuir F.C. players
Scottish Football League players
Year of birth missing
Place of birth missing
Association football outside forwards